= Andalusia Academy =

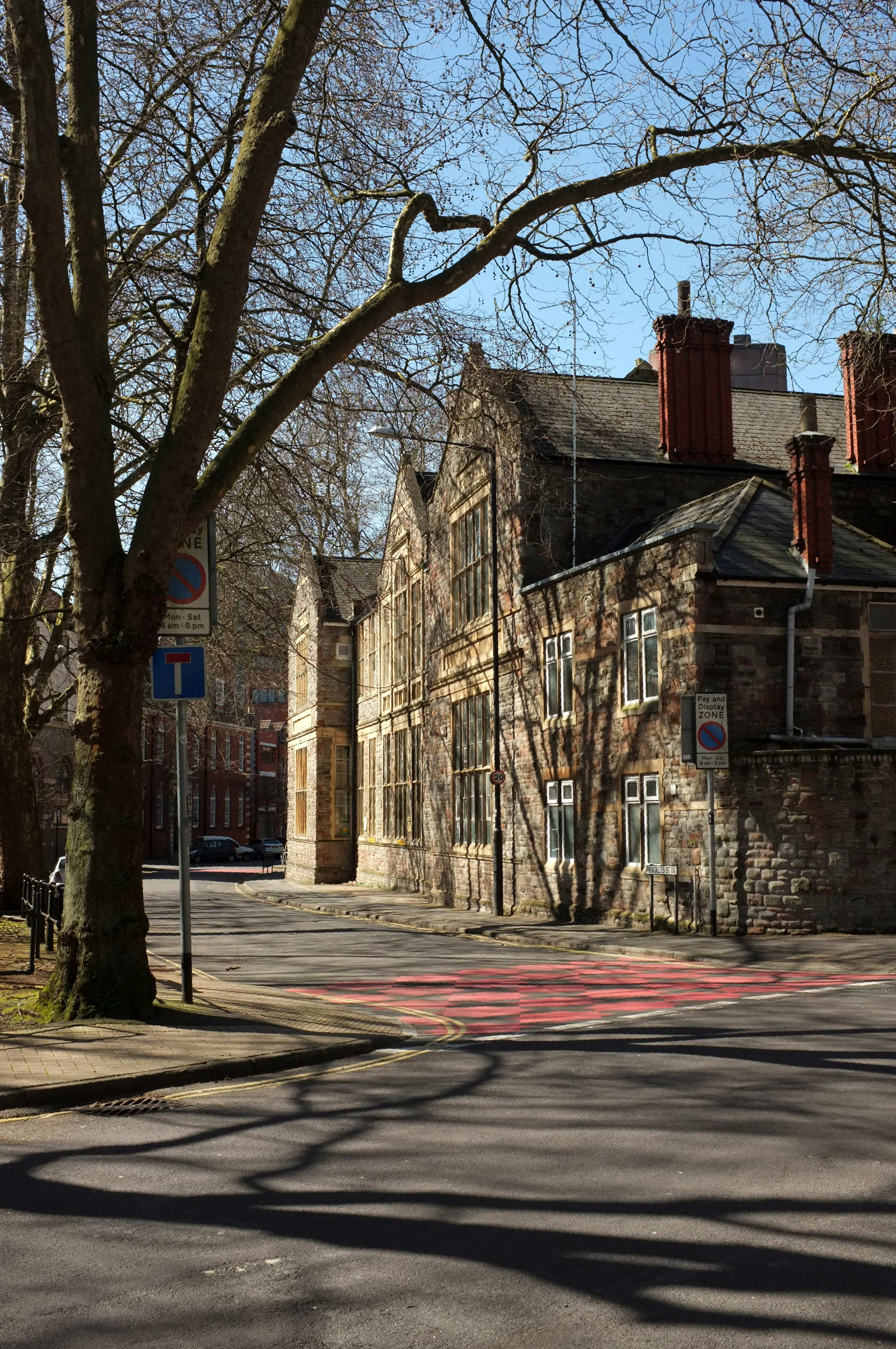
- The school building (2018)

Location
- St Matthias Park; Bristol, BS2 0BA; England; 51.457165°N 2.582146°W

Information
- Religious affiliation: Islam
- Established: 2005
- Closed: 2022
- Department for Education URN: 130391 Tables
- Ofsted: Reports
- Gender: Mixed
- Age: 4 to 16
- Enrolment: 311
- Capacity: 336
- Website: http://www.andalusiaacademy.org/

Andalusia Academy was an independent school in the city of Bristol, England. Before closure, it was the only full-time independent school with an Islamic ethos in South West England.

The school opened in 2005 and is run by Bristol Islamic Schools Trust (BIST). The trust was formed in 1997 to establish schools that teach the National Curriculum with an Islamic ethos.

The school closed in 2022 after falling standards and financial difficulties.
